Edmond Joseph Chehade (born 30 September 1993) is a Lebanese footballer and former futsal player who plays as a forward for  club Nejmeh.

Club career 
Born in Zgharta, Lebanon, Chehade moved to Batroun. He began playing football for Chekka in the Lebanese Third Division, before moving to futsal, playing for Tripoli Fayhaa and Sadaka, with whom he won the 2012–13 league title.

Chehade returned to play football, joining Salam Zgharta in the 2015–16 Lebanese Premier League. On 11 September 2019, Nejmeh announced the signing of Chehade for a fee of USD$150,000.

International career 
Chehade played for the Lebanon national futsal team. He made his international debut for the national football team in 2016, in a friendly against Palestine.

Personal life 
In 2014, Chehade represented Lebanon for the first season of the reality show The Victorious, finishing among the finalists.

Honours 
Sadaka (futsal)
 Lebanese Futsal League: 2012–13

Nejmeh
 Lebanese FA Cup: 2021–22; runner-up: 2020–21
 Lebanese Elite Cup: 2021
 Lebanese Super Cup runner-up: 2021

References

External links

 
 
 
 
 

1993 births
Living people
People from Zgharta
Lebanese footballers
Lebanese men's futsal players
Association football forwards
Futsal forwards
Sadaka SC futsal players
Salam Zgharta FC players
Nejmeh SC players
Lebanese Premier League players
Lebanon international footballers